John D. Wallace (born March 26, 1949) is a lawyer and retired Canadian Senator.

Early life and career
Wallace was born in Toronto, Ontario and raised and educated in New Brunswick.

He received his Bachelor of Business Administration (1971) and Bachelor of Laws (1973) degrees from the University of New Brunswick.

Wallace practiced law in Saint John, New Brunswick where he was a partner in the law firms of Palmer, O’Connell, Leger, Turnbull and Turnbull and Stewart McKelvey before leaving private practice to serve as Corporate Counsel for Irving Oil Limited for 17 years.

Senate
On December 22, 2008, it was announced that he would be appointed on the advice of Stephen Harper to the Senate. He assumed office on January 2, 2009.

In 2014, The Hill Times reported that Wallace was part of a bipartisan group of Liberal and Conservative Senators that secretly met to discuss how to reform the Senate from within.

On November 18, 2015, Wallace announced that he was leaving the Conservative caucus because of irreconcilable differences between himself and party leadership over the role of partisanship in the Senate, citing the 2014 Supreme Court Reference that declared that the Fathers of Confederation wanted the Senate to be "thoroughly independent."

Wallace announced on December 13, 2016, that he was retiring from the Senate effective February 1, 2017, just over seven years prior to reaching the mandatory retirement age of 75, as he promised when he was appointed that he would only serve eight years in the Upper House. None of the other 17 senators appointed with Wallace in January 2009 who made the same pledge, have announced plans to step down.

References

External links
 

1949 births
Canadian senators from New Brunswick
Conservative Party of Canada senators
Independent Canadian senators
Living people
People from Albert County, New Brunswick
Politicians from Toronto
21st-century Canadian politicians
University of New Brunswick Faculty of Law alumni
Lawyers in New Brunswick